Kelsey Thomas Mooney (born 5 February 1999) is an English professional footballer who plays as a striker for Leamington.

Career
Mooney began his career with Aston Villa, turning professional in February 2017. He moved on loan to Cheltenham Town in August 2018. He made his debut on 1 September 2018, in the English Football League, scoring his first goal a week later.

He left Aston Villa at the end of the 2018–19 season, signing for Hereford in October 2019. In March 2020 he said that he hoped his partnership with new teammate Lenell John-Lewis would allow him to score more goals, and for the team to win more games. In July 2020 it was reported that Mooney had accepted an offer to return to a club in the Football League, although Hereford manager Josh Gowling wanted him to stay at the club. On 3 August 2020 he signed a one-year contract with Scunthorpe United. On 16 October 2020 he returned to Hereford on loan. He was one of 17 players released by Scunthorpe at the end of the 2020–21 season. In August 2021 he joined Leamington.

Personal life
His father is former professional footballer Tommy Mooney.

Honours 
Aston Villa U23

 Premier League Cup: 2017–18

References

1999 births
Living people
English footballers
Association football forwards
Aston Villa F.C. players
Cheltenham Town F.C. players
Hereford F.C. players
Scunthorpe United F.C. players
Leamington F.C. players
English Football League players
National League (English football) players